"Sommarparty" (English "Summer Party") is a summer song written by Lasse Holm and Ingela "Pling" Forsman, and originally performed by the Herreys at the 1985 Sopot Music Festival Grand Prix, winning the contest. The Herreys also recorded the song on the 1985 album Crazy People, and in English, as "Summerparty", on the 1986 album Herrey's Story

Other recordings
The song was recorded by Stig-Roland Holmblm on the 1985 album Memories 1985. 
In 1996, Flamingokvintetten also recorded the song, releasing it as a single. and on the album Favoriter.

Chart trajectories

References

1985 songs
Herreys songs
Songs written by Lasse Holm
Songs with lyrics by Ingela Forsman
Swedish-language songs